The Border Chronicle is a weekly newspaper published in Bordertown, South Australia from June 1908 to the present day. Its head office is in Smith Street, Naracoorte. It was later sold to Rural Press, previously owned by Fairfax Media, but now an Australian media company trading as Australian Community Media.

History
The paper's founder was Leslie Duncan. The first issue of The Border Chronicle (subtitled: "The only newspaper printed in the huge Tatiara District") was Saturday 13 June 1908. It described itself as "A Journal devoted to the News of the district. the various markets, and condensed reports of State, Inter-State and World's News". It was published in broadsheet style, in a press at the rear of Bordertown's first Institute building on Woolshed Street. Donald Campbell became the sole proprietor in 1931.

In 1939, the paper moved to 74 DeCourcey Street in Bordertown, and in 1950 it was bought by Roy Poulton and Ross Warne. The business continued as Neil Poulton took over, with the Poulton family involved in running the business for nearly 80 years. Alongside many other rural publications in Australia, the newspaper was a member of Fairfax Media Limited (after being purchased in 2010). The newspaper's first building, at DeCourcey Street, was auctioned in November 2017, after Farifax scaled back newspaper operations and closed the Chronicle's commercial printing business and office.

Distribution
The Border Chronicle is published every Wednesday, and serves the Tatiara District, which includes major towns such as Bordertown, Keith, Mundulla, Padthaway, and Wolseley. Its circulation also includes Tintinara, Coonalpyn and across the state border to Kaniva in Victoria. It has an estimated weekly readership of 5,300. Like other Rural Press publications, the newspaper is also available online.

Digitisation
The National Library of Australia has digitised photographic copies of early issues of The Border Chronicle from Vol 1, No.1 of 13 June 1908  to Vol. 43 No. 2,184 of 21 December 1950, which may be accessed via Trove.

References

External links
 Border Chronicle website
 

Newspapers published in South Australia
Newspapers established in 1908
1908 establishments in Australia
Weekly newspapers published in Australia